Bertram Francis Gurdon, 2nd Baron Cranworth KG, MC (13 June 1877 – 4 January 1964) was a British peer and soldier.

Gurdon was the eldest son of Robert Gurdon, 1st Baron Cranworth and was educated at Trinity College, Cambridge.

He was commissioned a second lieutenant in the Norfolk Artillery on 7 March 1900, and volunteered for active service in the Second Boer War in South Africa. He was promoted to lieutenant on 25 August 1900. Two years into the war, he was wounded, but was discharged from hospital to duty in May 1902, shortly before the end of hostilities. He left Cape Town on board the  the following month, and arrived at Southampton in early July. He inherited his father's title in October 1902 and later became a captain.

On 18 July 1903, he married Vera Ridley (a cousin of Matthew Ridley, 1st Viscount Ridley). In 1937, he was appointed Honorary Colonel of the 358th (Suffolk) Medium Regiment and on retiring in 1948, was made a Knight of the Garter. Lord Cranworth died in 1964 and his title passed to his grandson, Philip (his only son Robert having been killed in action in Libya in 1942).

Arms

References

Burke's Peerage & Gentry

External links

1877 births
1964 deaths
Royal Artillery officers
British Army personnel of the Second Boer War
Barons in the Peerage of the United Kingdom
Knights of the Garter
Recipients of the Military Cross
Alumni of Trinity College, Cambridge